Ilya Valentinovich Rutsky (born 3 December 1999) is a Belarusian professional footballer who plays for Slavia Mozyr.

References

External links 
 
 

1999 births
Living people
Sportspeople from Brest, Belarus
Belarusian footballers
Association football defenders
FC Belshina Bobruisk players
FC Sputnik Rechitsa players
FC Slavia Mozyr players